BlaBlaCar bus, formerly BlaBlaBus, Ouibus or iDBUS, operates coach services in Europe. Currently, BlaBlaCar Bus serves Aix-en-Provence, Amsterdam, Barcelona, Brussels, Genoa, Lille, London, Lyon, Marseille, Milan, Nice, Paris, Paris Charles de Gaulle Airport, San Sebastián, and Turin. The route network is expanding progressively. BlaBlaCar Bus has three major hubs;  Paris-Bercy, Lyon-Perrache, and Lille-Europe. Founded in 2012 by SNCF, in November 2018 it was announced that it would be purchased by BlaBlaCar and rebranded as BlaBlaBus.

History

iDBUS was launched on 23 July 2012 with services to Amsterdam, London, and Brussels from the original hub at Paris-Bercy. A domestic service between Paris and Lille was launched on 29 August 2012.

A second hub was created at Lyon-Perrache on 17 December 2012 to launch Milan and Turin destinations. On 23 May 2013, iDBUS began operating services between Marseille and Nice, Genoa and Milan. On 28 April 2014 iDBUS launched a service from Brussels to Amsterdam, London and Charles de Gaulle Airport.

On 1 December 2014, iDBUS started operating into Germany, with a service from Paris to Brussels, Aachen and Cologne. From 15 June 2015 iDBUS expanded further in the Benelux region, with Rotterdam and Antwerp added to the network. On the same date, a London to Lyon route started.

On 3 September 2015, iDBUS was rebranded Ouibus. In July 2016, the Starshipper business was purchased.

In February 2018, Ouibus entered a partnership with ALSA and National Express. In November 2018, it was announced the business would be purchased by BlaBlaCar.

Entering the German market in 2020, BlaBlaBus became the first major competitor of Flixbus since that company had achieved a nigh-monopoly in the German long distance bus market through market consolidation, mergers and acquisition of competitors.

Deadly accident 
On 10 April 2022, an accident happened close to Antwerp, Belgium. Two occupants of the bus were instantly killed, whilst several others were left in a life-threatening condition. Blame is initially given to the driver of the bus, whom tested positively for drugs just after the accident. Police also stated that driver of the bus was known for drug offences in the past.

Fleet
BlaBlaCar Bus has a fleet of 46 Setra, Mercedes-Benz and Iveco coaches that meet the Euro 5 emission standard. The whole fleet is fitted with Wi-Fi, plug sockets and spaces for disabled passengers.

On a number of the services to/from Spain, a fleet of Irizar i6 coaches operated by Sarfa are used. These operate in the Ouibus livery.

The fleet is equipped with toilets and free WiFi, and offers power outlets at every seat.

References

External links

Official website

International bus transport in Europe
SNCF companies and subsidiaries
Transport companies established in 2012
2012 establishments in France
2018 mergers and acquisitions